In the social sciences, unintended consequences (sometimes unanticipated consequences or unforeseen consequences) are outcomes of a purposeful action that are not intended or foreseen. The term was popularised in the twentieth century by American sociologist Robert K. Merton and expanded by economist Thomas Sowell and psychologist Stuart Vyse.

Unintended consequences can be grouped into three types:
 Unexpected benefit:  A positive unexpected benefit (also referred to as luck, serendipity or a windfall).
 Unexpected drawback:  An unexpected detriment occurring in addition to the desired effect of the policy (e.g., while irrigation schemes provide people with water for agriculture, they can increase waterborne diseases that have devastating health effects, such as schistosomiasis).
 Perverse result: A perverse effect contrary to what was originally intended (when an intended solution makes a problem worse).

History

John Locke
The idea of unintended consequences dates back at least to John Locke who discussed the unintended consequences of interest rate regulation in his letter to Sir John Somers, Member of Parliament.

Adam Smith
The idea was also discussed by Adam Smith, the Scottish Enlightenment, and consequentialism (judging by results).

The invisible hand theorem is an example of the unintended consequences of agents acting in their self-interest. As Andrew S. Skinner puts it:

"The individual undertaker (entrepreneur), seeking the most efficient allocation of resources, contributes to overall economic efficiency; the merchant’s reaction to price signals helps to ensure that the allocation of resources accurately reflects the structure of consumer preferences; and the drive to better our condition contributes to economic growth."

Friedrich Engels
Friedrich Engels touched on the idea of unintended consequences in his discussion of Ludwig Feuerbach: "The ends of the actions are intended, but the results which actually follow from these actions are not intended; or when they do seem to correspond to the end intended, they ultimately have consequences quite other than those intended."

Robert K. Merton
Sociologist Robert K. Merton popularised this concept in the twentieth century.

In "The Unanticipated Consequences of Purposive Social Action" (1936), Merton tried to apply a systematic analysis to the problem of unintended consequences of deliberate acts intended to cause social change. He emphasized that his term purposive action, "[was exclusively] concerned with 'conduct' as distinct from 'behavior.' That is, with action that involves motives and consequently a choice between various alternatives". Merton's usage included deviations from what Max Weber defined as rational social action: instrumentally rational and value rational. Merton also stated that "no blanket statement categorically affirming or denying the practical feasibility of all social planning is warranted."

Everyday usage
More recently, the law of unintended consequences has come to be used as an adage or idiomatic warning that an intervention in a complex system tends to create unanticipated and often undesirable outcomes.

Akin to Murphy's law, it is commonly used as a wry or humorous warning against the hubristic belief that humans can fully control the world around them, not to presuppose a belief in predestination or a lack or a disbelief in that of free will.

Causes
Possible causes of unintended consequences include the world's inherent complexity (parts of a system responding to changes in the environment), perverse incentives, human stupidity, self-deception, failure to account for human nature, or other cognitive or emotional biases. As a sub-component of complexity (in the scientific sense), the chaotic nature of the universe—and especially its quality of having small, apparently insignificant changes with far-reaching effects (e.g., the butterfly effect)—applies.

In 1936, Robert K. Merton listed five possible causes of unanticipated consequences:

 Ignorance, making it  impossible to anticipate everything, thereby leading to incomplete analysis.
 Errors in analysis of the problem or following habits that worked in the past but may not apply to the current situation.
 Immediate interests overriding long-term interests.
 Basic values which may require or prohibit certain actions even if the long-term result might be unfavourable (these long-term consequences may eventually cause changes in basic values).
 Self-defeating prophecy, or, the fear of some consequence which drives people to find solutions before the problem occurs, thus the non-occurrence of the problem is not anticipated.

In addition to Merton's causes, psychologist Stuart Vyse has noted that groupthink, described by Irving Janis, has been blamed for some decisions that result in unintended consequences.

Types

Unexpected benefits

The creation of "no-man's lands" during the Cold War, in places such as the border between Eastern and Western Europe, and the Korean Demilitarized Zone, has led to large natural habitats.

The sinking of ships in shallow waters during wartime has created many artificial coral reefs, which can be scientifically valuable and have become an attraction for recreational divers. This led to the deliberately sinking of retired ships for the purpose of replacing coral reefs lost to global warming and other factors.

In medicine, most drugs have unintended consequences ('side effects') associated with their use. However, some are beneficial. For instance, aspirin, a pain reliever, is also an anticoagulant that can help prevent heart attacks and reduce the severity and damage from thrombotic strokes. The existence of beneficial side effects also leads to off-label use—prescription or use of a drug for an unlicensed purpose. Famously, the drug Viagra was developed to lower blood pressure, with its use for treating erectile dysfunction being discovered as a side effect in clinical trials.

Unexpected drawbacks
The implementation of a profanity filter by AOL in 1996 had the unintended consequence of blocking residents of Scunthorpe, North Lincolnshire, England, from creating accounts because of a false positive. The accidental censorship of innocent language, known as the Scunthorpe problem, has been repeated and widely documented.

In 1990, the Australian state of Victoria made safety helmets mandatory for all bicycle riders. While there was a reduction in the number of head injuries, there was also an unintended reduction in the number of juvenile cyclists—fewer cyclists obviously leads to fewer injuries, all else being equal. The risk of death and serious injury per cyclist seems to have increased, possibly because of risk compensation. Research by Vulcan, et al. found that the reduction in juvenile cyclists was because the youths considered wearing a bicycle helmet unfashionable. A health-benefit model developed at Macquarie University in Sydney suggests that, while helmet use reduces "the risk of head or brain injury by approximately two-thirds or more", the decrease in exercise caused by reduced cycling as a result of helmet laws is counterproductive in terms of net health.

Prohibition in the 1920s United States, originally enacted to suppress the alcohol trade, drove many small-time alcohol suppliers out of business and consolidated the hold of large-scale organized crime over the illegal alcohol industry. Since alcohol was still popular, criminal organisations producing alcohol were well-funded and hence also increased their other activities. Similarly, the War on Drugs, intended to suppress the illegal drug trade, instead increased the power and profitability of drug cartels who became the primary source of the products.

In CIA jargon, "blowback" describes the unintended, undesirable consequences of covert operations, such as the funding of the Afghan Mujahideen and the destabilization of Afghanistan contributing to the rise of the Taliban and Al-Qaeda.

The introduction of exotic animals and plants for food, for decorative purposes, or to control unwanted species often leads to more harm than good done by the introduced species.
 The introduction of rabbits in Australia and New Zealand for food was followed by an explosive growth in the rabbit population; rabbits have become a major feral pest in these countries.
 Cane toads, introduced into Australia to control canefield pests, were unsuccessful and have become a major pest in their own right.
 Kudzu, introduced to the US as an ornamental plant in 1876 and later used to prevent erosion in earthworks, has become a major problem in the Southeastern United States. Kudzu has displaced native plants and has effectively taken over significant portions of land.

The protection of the steel industry in the United States reduced production of steel in the United States, increased costs to users, and increased unemployment in associated industries.

Perverse results

In 2003, Barbra Streisand unsuccessfully sued Kenneth Adelman and Pictopia.com for posting a photograph of her home online. Before the lawsuit had been filed, only 6 people had downloaded the file, two of them Streisand's attorneys. The lawsuit drew attention to the image, resulting in 420,000 people visiting the site. The Streisand Effect was named after this incident, describing when an attempt to censor or remove a certain piece of information instead draws attention to the material being suppressed, resulting in the material instead becoming widely known, reported on, and distributed.

Passenger-side airbags in motorcars were intended as a safety feature, but led to an increase in child fatalities in the mid-1990s because small children were being hit by airbags that deployed automatically during collisions. The supposed solution to this problem, moving the child seat to the back of the vehicle, led to an increase in the number of children forgotten in unattended vehicles, some of whom died under extreme temperature conditions.

Risk compensation, or the Peltzman effect, occurs after implementation of safety measures intended to reduce injury or death (e.g. bike helmets, seatbelts, etc.). People may feel safer than they really are and take additional risks which they would not have taken without the safety measures in place. This may result in no change, or even an increase, in morbidity or mortality, rather than a decrease as intended.

According to an anecdote, the British government, concerned about the number of venomous cobra snakes in Delhi, offered a bounty for every dead cobra. This was a successful strategy as large numbers of snakes were killed for the reward. Eventually, enterprising people began breeding cobras for the income. When the government became aware of this, they scrapped the reward program, causing the cobra breeders to set the now-worthless snakes free. As a result, the wild cobra population further increased. The apparent solution for the problem made the situation even worse, becoming known as the Cobra effect.

Theobald Mathew's temperance campaign in 19th-century Ireland resulted in thousands of people vowing never to drink alcohol again. This led to the consumption of diethyl ether, a much more dangerous intoxicant—owing to its high flammability—by those seeking to become intoxicated without breaking the letter of their pledge.

It was thought that adding south-facing conservatories to British houses would reduce energy consumption by providing extra insulation and warmth from the sun. However, people tended to use the conservatories as living areas, installing heating and ultimately increasing overall energy consumption.

A reward for lost nets found along the Normandy coast was offered by the French government between 1980 and 1981. This resulted in people vandalizing nets to collect the reward.

Beginning in the 1940s and continuing into the 1960s, the Canadian federal government gave the Catholic Church in Quebec $2.25 per day per psychiatric patient for their cost of care, but only $0.75 a day per orphan. The perverse result is that the orphan children were diagnosed as mentally ill so the church could receive the larger amount of money. This psychiatric misdiagnosis affected up to 20,000 people, and the children are known as the Duplessis Orphans.

There have been attempts to curb the consumption of sugary beverages by imposing a tax on them. However, a study found that the reduced consumption was only temporary. Also, there was an increase in the consumption of beer among households.

The New Jersey Childproof Handgun Law, which was intended to protect children from accidental discharge of firearms by forcing all future firearms sold in New Jersey to contain "smart" safety features, has delayed, if not stopped entirely, the introduction of such firearms to New Jersey markets. The wording of the law caused significant public backlash, fuelled by gun rights lobbyists, and several shop owners offering such guns received death threats and stopped stocking them. In 2014, 12 years after the law was passed, it was suggested the law be repealed if gun rights lobbyists agree not to resist the introduction of "smart" firearms.

Drug prohibition can lead drug traffickers to prefer stronger, more dangerous substances, that can be more easily smuggled and distributed than other, less concentrated substances.

Televised drug prevention advertisements may lead to increased drug use.

Increasing usage of search engines, also including recent image search features, has contributed in the ease of which media is consumed. Some abnormalities in usage may have shifted preferences for pornographic film actors, as the producers began using common search queries or tags to label the actors in new roles.

The passage of the Stop Enabling Sex Traffickers Act has led to a reported increase in risky behaviors by sex workers as a result of quashing their ability to seek and screen clients online, forcing them back onto the streets or into the dark web. The ads posted were previously an avenue for advocates to reach out to those wanting to escape the trade.

The use of precision guided munitions meant to reduce the rate of civilian casualties encouraged armies to narrow their safety margins, and increase the use of deadly force in densely populated areas. This in turn increased the danger to uninvolved civilians, who in the past would have been out of the line of fire because of armies' aversion of using higher-risk weaponry in densely populated areas. The perceived ability to operate precision weaponry from afar (where in the past heavy munitions or troop deployment would have been needed) also led to the expansion of the list of potential targets. As put by Michael Walzer: "Drones not only make it possible for us to get at our enemies, they may also lead us to broaden the list of enemies, to include presumptively hostile individuals and militant organizations simply because we can get at them–even if they aren’t actually involved in attacks against us." This idea is also echoed by Grégoire Chamayou: "In a situation of moral hazard, military action is very likely to be deemed 'necessary' simply because it is possible, and possible at a lower cost."

Other
According to Lynn White, the invention of the horse stirrup enabled new patterns of warfare that eventually led to the development of feudalism (see Stirrup Thesis).

Perverse consequences of environmental intervention

Most modern technologies have negative consequences that are both unavoidable and unpredictable. For example, almost all environmental problems, from chemical pollution to global warming, are the unexpected consequences of the application of modern technologies. Traffic congestion, deaths and injuries from car accidents, air pollution, and global warming are unintended consequences of the invention and large scale adoption of the automobile. Hospital infections are the unexpected side-effect of antibiotic resistance, and even human population growth leading to environmental degradation is the side effect of various technological (i.e., agricultural and industrial) revolutions.

Because of the complexity of ecosystems, deliberate changes to an ecosystem or other environmental interventions will often have (usually negative) unintended consequences. Sometimes, these effects cause permanent irreversible changes. Examples include:
 During the Four Pests Campaign a killing of sparrows was declared. Chinese leaders later realized that sparrows ate a large amount of insects, as well as grains. Rather than being increased, rice yields after the campaign were substantially decreased. (The decision to cull sparrows may itself have been an unintended consequence of silencing intellectuals: "For 3 years after the establishment of the Communist Government, in 1949, Chinese scientists and intellectuals found themselves in the midst of turmoil. Many scientists were humiliated and intimidated during the nationwide program of "thought reform" and political indoctrination".)
 During the Great Plague of London a killing of dogs and cats was ordered. If left untouched, they would have made a significant reduction in the rat population that carried the fleas which transmitted the disease.
 The installation of smokestacks to decrease pollution in local areas, resulting in spread of pollution at a higher altitude, and acid rain on an international scale.
 After about 1900, public demand led the US government to fight forest fires in the American West, and set aside land as national forests and parks to protect them from fires. This policy led to fewer fires, but also led to growth conditions such that, when fires did occur, they were much larger and more damaging. Modern research suggests that this policy was misguided, and that a certain level of wildfires is a natural and important part of forest ecology.
Side effects of climate engineering to counter global warming could involve even further warming as a consequence of reflectivity-reducing afforestation or crop yield reductions and rebound effects after solar dimming measures with even more accelerated warming.
Bill and Melinda Gates Foundation's and Spread the Net's provision of mosquito nets caused environmental and human destruction, as many of the people provided with these mosquito nets decided they were better used as fishing nets, leading to overfishing and similar unintended consequences.

See also

Notes

References
 The Unanticipated Consequences of Purposive Social Action by Robert K. Merton, American Sociological Review, Vol 1 Issue 6, Dec 1936, pp. 894–904
 Unintended Consequences entry in Concise Encyclopedia of Economics
Unintended Consequences blog
 Unintended Consequences of Green Technologies
 Mica Adriana, Peisert Arkadiusz, Winczorek Jan (eds), (2011), Sociology and the Unintended. Robert Merton Revisited, Peter Lang, Frankfurt am Main.
 Huesemann, Michael H., and Joyce A. Huesemann (2011). Technofix: Why Technology Won’t Save Us or the Environment, Chapter 1, “The Inherent Unavoidability and Unpredictability of Unintended Consequences”, Chapter 2, “Some Unintended Consequences of Modern Technology”, and Chapter 4, “In Search of Solutions I: Counter-Technologies and Social Fixes”, New Society Publishers, Gabriola Island, British Columbia, Canada, 464 pp.
 Edward Tenner, Why Things Bite Back: Technology and the Revenge of Unintended Consequences, Vintage Books, 1997.
 Tomislav V. Kovandzic, John Sloan III, and Lynne M. Vieraitis. Unintended Consequences of Politically Popular Sentencing Policy: The Homicide-Promoting Effects of 'Three Strikes' in U.S. Cities (1980–1999). Criminology & Public Policy Vol 1, Issue 3, July 2002.
 Vulcan, A.P., Cameron, M.H. & Heiman, L., "Evaluation of mandatory bicycle helmet use in Victoria, Australia", 36th Annual Conference Proceedings, Association for the Advancement of Automotive Medicine, October 5–7, 1992.
 Vulcan, A.P., Cameron, M.H. & Watson, W.L., "Mandatory Bicycle Helmet Use: Experience in Victoria, Australia", World Journal of Surgery, Vol. 16, No. 3, (May/June 1992), pp. 389–397.
 "Hidden Costs of Energy: Unpriced Consequences of Energy Production and Use"
 Alan Watts: The Story of the Chinese Farmer

Adages
Complex systems theory
Concepts in ethics
Consequentialism
Futures studies
Intention
Principles
Risk management
Social sciences terminology
Robert K. Merton